Little Flower School may refer to:
Little Flowers' School, Uttapara, Hooghly, India
Little Flower School, Imphal, Manipur, India
Little Flower School, Mudinepalli, English Medium school in Mudinepalli
Willes Little Flower School, school in Dhaka, Bangladesh

See also
Little Flower High School (disambiguation)
Little Flower (disambiguation)